KHRT-FM (106.9 FM) is a Christian radio station located in Minot, North Dakota. It is one of two religious stations, along with KHRT, owned and operated in Minot by Faith Broadcasting. KHRT-FM concentrates on a Christian hot AC format, and also airs satellite-fed programming from Salem Communications during overnights and weekends. The station is rebroadcast on several translators (low-powered rebroadcasters) outside of its main listening area. It also streams on the internet.

Although classified as a commercial radio station by the Federal Communications Commission (FCC), Faith Broadcasting acts as a nonprofit organization using commercial advertisements for funding, though it also takes donations.

History

The initial application for the station was submitted in 1987, and the KHRT-FM call letters were assigned on January 18, 1991. The station began regular broadcasting in 1992.

References

External links
KHRT website

HRT
Contemporary Christian radio stations in the United States
Radio stations established in 1992
1992 establishments in North Dakota
Southern Gospel radio stations in the United States
HRT